Conrado Balweg was a former Filipino Catholic priest and rebel who was the founder of the Cordillera People’s Liberation Army, a militant group which advocated autonomy for the Cordillera region in the Philippines. He was also known by the nom-de-guerre Ka Ambo.

Career
Balweg, a member of the Tingguian people, was ordained a priest of the Society of the Divine Word congregation by Pope Paul VI in 1970 during the latter's pastoral visit to Manila. He joined the New People's Army in 1979 when he was inspired to fight for the Cordillera people after tribal leader Macli-ing Dulag was killed that same year. Dulag was opposed to a plan of the government to build a hydroelectric dam in the Cordilleras. As an NPA member, he was part of the Lumbaya Company.

Balweg formed the Cordillera People’s Liberation Army (CPLA) in 1986 with fellow priest, Bruno Ortega. Under his leadership, the CPLA made a "sipat" or ceasefire with the Philippine government at the Mt. Data Hotel, in Bauko, Mountain Province on September 13, 1986. The agreement between the two sides was called the 1986 Mount Data Peace Accord.

Death
Members of the Chadli Molintas Cordillera Region Command of the New People's Army killed Balweg at his residence in Malibcong, Abra in the early morning of December 31, 1999. The unit was led by his brother Juvencio, who denied firing the shots that fatally wounded Balweg. The New People's Army issued a statement that they killed Balweg for alleged "crimes against the Cordilleran people and the Revolutionary Movement".

Another NPA member, Procorpio Tauro also known as "Pyro" and "Ka Lito", was found by the Philippine police to be directly responsible for  killing Balweg. Tauro, along with Balweg's brother and other NPA members were present when the killing occurred.

Personal life
Balweg was married to Corazon Cortel. Upon Balweg's death in 1999, Cortel became the Chief of Staff of the CPLA. Cortel died at Camp Upi in Gamu, Isabela on March 10, 2008, leaving behind five children.

Jordan, one of Balweg's children, was a CPLA member who was integrated into the Philippine Army in 2012.

In popular culture
Balweg's turn from a priest to a communist rebel was depicted in the 1987 film Balweg, directed by Anthony "Butch" Perez and starring Phillip Salvador as Balweg and Rio Locsin as his wife Azon.

References

1942 births
1999 deaths
20th-century Filipino Roman Catholic priests
Assassinated Filipino people
Filipino communists
Northern Luzon during martial law under Ferdinand Marcos
People from Abra (province)